Hussain Al Mutawaa is a Kuwaiti writer, poet, literary critic and a photographer who was born in 1989. He published two novels and two short stories. In 2019, his short story "I Dream of Being a Cement Mixer" won Sheikh Zayed Book Award for Child Literature and which was translated into English, French, Ukrainian and Italian. Before turning to stories and novels, Al Mutawaa started his literary career in literature as a poet in 2009.

Education and career 
Hussain Al Mutawaa was born on 19 June 1989. He has a bachelor's degree in Literature and Criticism from the Arabic Language College with a Minor in philosophy from University of Kuwait. Al Mutawaa started his career in literature as a poet in 2009 which he participated in many poetry events and festivals and won the first place in the "University Poet and Storyteller" category at University of Kuwait. In 2015, he turned from poetry to stories and then to novels. He published his first novel, Sand, in 2017. Then, in 2018, he published the short story "I Dream of Being a Cement Mixer", which won the Sheikh Zayed Book Award in 2019 for the category Children's Literature and was translated into many languages including English, French, and Italian. Al Mutawaa has participated in many event and festivals such as the Emirates Airline Festival of Literature, Abu Dhabi International Book Fair, and Frankfurt Book Fair.

Novels 

 Sand (Original title: Turab), 2017
 Alf Layla w Layla Agendat Takween

Short stories 

 "I Dream Being a Cement Mixer" (Original title: Ahlum An Akun Khalat Ismant), 2018
 "Deeper into my heart" (Original title: Amekan Nahwa Kalbi), 2020

See also 

 Abderrazak Belagrouz 
 Abdallah Al Busais 
 Mohamed Ait Mihoub

References 

21st-century Kuwaiti writers
21st-century biographers
21st-century novelists
21st-century short story writers
Kuwait University alumni
1989 births
Living people